Anatoly Arkadevich Blagonravov (– 4 February 1975) was a Soviet engineer and diplomat.  He represented the Soviet Union on the United Nations Committee on the Peaceful Uses of Outer Space (COPUOS).  He worked closely with Hugh Dryden, his American counterpart, to promote 
international cooperation on space projects at the height of the Cold War.  Anatoli adopted a dog named Tsygan, one of the first dogs to make a successful sub-orbital flight in 1951. Blagonravov died at the age of 80 in Moscow.

Start of US/Soviet spaceflight cooperation

Blagonravov was instrumental in opening the door to international cooperation in human spaceflight.

After John Glenn's orbital flight, an exchange of letters between President John F. Kennedy and Soviet Premiere Nikita Khrushchev led to a series of discussions led by Blagonravov and NASA Deputy Director Hugh Dryden. Their talks in 1962 led to the Dryden-Blagonravov agreement, which was formalized in October of that year, the same time the two countries were in the midst of the Cuban Missile Crisis. The agreement was formally announced at the United Nations on December 5, 1962. It called for cooperation on the exchange of data from weather satellites, a study of the Earth's magnetic field, and joint tracking of the U.S. Echo II balloon satellite. Unfortunately, as the competition between the two nation's manned space programs heated up, efforts to further cooperation at that point came to an end.

In April 1970, he held informal talks in New York City with NASA Administrator Thomas O. Paine, about the possibility of performing a rendezvous and docking of a US and Soviet spacecraft. This led to an agreement signed on May 24, 1972, by US President Richard M. Nixon and Soviet Premier Alexei Kosygin, calling for such a joint manned space mission, and declaring intent for all future international manned spacecraft to be capable of docking with each other. On July 17, 1975, the crews of a US Apollo spacecraft and a Soviet Soyuz spacecraft performed such a docking, visiting each other's spacecraft, shaking hands, exchanging gifts, and performing joint experiments in space.

Blagonravov was inducted as a member of the inaugural class to the International Space Hall of Fame.

References

Further reading

External links
 Blagonravov, Anatoli Encyclopedia of Science entry, retrieved Sept 15 2007



1894 births
1975 deaths
Soviet physicists
Full Members of the USSR Academy of Sciences
Heroes of Socialist Labour
Soviet space program personnel
Soviet diplomats